The ancient big house of Palavé, located roughly 22 km to the west of Santo Domingo, the capital of the Dominican Republic.  Its unique architectural style and ancient age has led to its consideration to be put on the World Heritage list of sites who have "outstanding universal value" to the world.

World Heritage Status 

This site was added to the UNESCO World Heritage Tentative List on November 21, 2001 in the Cultural category.

Notes

References 
World Heritage Center: The Criteria for Selection Accessed 2009-02-26.

The Ancient Big House of Palavé (Ruta de Los Ingenios) - UNESCO World Heritage Centre Accessed 2009-02-26.

Dominican Republic culture